Jelani Osei Nelson (born June 28, 1984) is an Ethiopian-American Professor of Electrical Engineering and Computer Sciences at the University of California, Berkeley. He won the 2014 Presidential Early Career Award for Scientists and Engineers. Nelson is the creator of AddisCoder, a computer science summer program for Ethiopian high school students in Addis Ababa.

Early life and education 
Nelson was born to an Ethiopian mother and an African-American father in Los Angeles, then grew up in St. Thomas, U.S. Virgin Islands. He studied mathematics and computer science at the Massachusetts Institute of Technology and remained there to complete his doctoral studies in computer science. His Master's dissertation, External-Memory Search Trees with Fast Insertions, was supervised by Bradley C. Kuszmaul and Charles E. Leiserson. He was a member of the theory of computation group, working on efficient algorithms for massive datasets. His doctoral dissertation, Sketching and Streaming High-Dimensional Vectors (2011), was supervised by Erik Demaine and Piotr Indyk.

After his doctorate, Nelson worked as a postdoctoral scholar at the Mathematical Sciences Research Institute in Berkeley, California, then Princeton University and the Institute for Advanced Study. He specialises in sketching and streaming algorithms.

Career 
Nelson is interested in big data and the development of efficient algorithms. He joined the computer science faculty at Harvard University in 2013 and remained there until 2019 before joining UC Berkeley. He is known for his contributions to streaming algorithms and dimensionality reduction, including proving that the Johnson–Lindenstrauss lemma is optimal (with Kasper Green Larsen), developing the Sparse Johnson-Lindenstrauss Transform (with Daniel Kane), and an asymptotically optimal algorithm for the count-distinct problem (with Daniel Kane and David P. Woodruff). He holds two patents related to applications of streaming algorithms to network traffic monitoring applications.
Nelson was the recipient of an Office of Naval Research Young Investigator Award in 2015 and a Director of Research Early Career Award in 2016. He was awarded an Alfred P. Sloan Foundation Fellowship in 2017.

Jo Boaler incident 

Nelson was involved in an online conflict with Stanford University professor Jo Boaler over efforts to revise California's framework for math instruction in April 2022. Nelson retweeted a posting on Twitter criticising the amount that Boaler had been paid for training teachers in the Oxnard Elementary School District. In response to this, Boaler sent Nelson an email stating that police and lawyers were taking up “the sharing of private details about [her] on social media”. Nelson subsequently posted a tweet stating that "[a] Stanford professor" (Boaler) was threatening him with police, further stating that "we now have Retweet Rachel" and "don't call the cops on black people for no reason. Black people disagreeing with you on Twitter is not a crime". In response, Boaler claimed that "I would never even think of threatening a Black man with the police" and that she "did not intend it to be threatening", as well as contesting the claims about how much she had earnt from her teacher training work.

AddisCoder 
Nelson founded the AddisCoder program in 2011 whilst finishing his PhD at Massachusetts Institute of Technology, a summer program teaching computer science and algorithms to high schoolers in Ethiopia. The program has trained over 500 alumni, some of which have gone on to study at Harvard, MIT, Columbia, Stanford, Cornell, Princeton, KAIST, and Seoul National University.

Awards and honours 
2017 Presidential Early Career Award for Scientists and Engineers
2017 Alfred P. Sloan Research Fellowship
2011 George M. Sprowls Award for Outstanding Doctoral Thesis
2010 IBM Research Pat Goldberg Memorial Best Paper Award

References

External links
 Personal page

American people of Ethiopian descent
People from Saint Thomas, U.S. Virgin Islands
Harvard University faculty
Massachusetts Institute of Technology alumni
Alfred P. Sloan Prize winners
Computer scientists
American computer scientists
African-American computer scientists
1984 births
Living people
University of California, Berkeley faculty
21st-century African-American people
20th-century African-American people